Pedro de Padilla, (? in Talavera de la Reina – 1599 in Granada, Spain), a prominent member of the Military Order of Santiago after 1597, captain of the Infantry in Flanders and Maestro de Campo in Naples, Italy.

Biography 
During 1569–1571 he served under the command of John of Austria in the war against the moriscos in Granada,  fighting also in the Battles of Lepanto and Navarino against the Ottoman Turks and operating in North Africa besieging places now located in Morocco and Algeria.

He had been involved previously in the military operations against the Portuguese Nobility in the 1580 succession crisis whereby king Philip II of Spain claimed his right to the Portuguese throne as his mother was a Portuguese Princess, becoming thus king Philip I of Portugal. Pedro was promoted afterwards to Governor of Oran and Mazalquivir (1585–1589) and was, during 1595, interim Governor of the Duchy of Milan to cover the absence of Juan Fernández de Velasco, Governor of the Duchy of Milan.

References 

Diego Hurtado de Mendoza: Guerra de Granada, hecha por el Rey de España Don Felipe II nuestro señor contra los moriscos de aquel Reyno, sus rebeldes. In Spanish. Many other, including recent translated and in the original language editions also. 
 Luis del Mármol Carvajal: Historia del rebelion y castigo de los Moriscos del reyno de Granada. In Spanish, but available also in other more or less recent translated editions. 

Governors of the Duchy of Milan
1599 deaths
16th-century Spanish people
Spanish generals
Year of birth unknown
Order of Santiago